The Hulsey Bend School is a historic one-room schoolhouse building in rural southeastern Independence County, Arkansas. It is a single-story wood-frame structure, with a gable roof and weatherboard siding. The gabled ends each have an entrance, while the sides each have three windows. Built c. 1900, it is the best-preserved district schoolhouse in the Oil Trough area and believed to be the last in the county; it was used as a school until 1947.

The building was listed on the National Register of Historic Places in 1999.

See also
National Register of Historic Places listings in Independence County, Arkansas

References

School buildings on the National Register of Historic Places in Arkansas
One-room schoolhouses in Arkansas
School buildings completed in 1900
National Register of Historic Places in Independence County, Arkansas
1900 establishments in Arkansas
Schools in Independence County, Arkansas